Vodafone India Limited (formerly Vodafone Essar, Huchison Essar) was the Indian subsidiary of UK-based Vodafone Group plc and was a provider of Telecommunications services in India with its operational head office in Mumbai. As of March 2018, Vodafone India had a market share of 21% and with its merger with Idea, the collective Vodafone Idea network has approximately 375 million subscribers and is the Third largest mobile telecommunications network in India.

History

Hutchison Max Telecom Ltd. (HMTL), a joint venture between Hutchison Whampoa and the Max Group, was established on 21 February 1992. The licence to operate in Mumbai (then Bombay) circle was awarded to Hutchison Max by the Department of Telecommunications (DoT) in November 1994. The cellular service branded "Max Touch" was launched the same year. Hutchison Max entered into the Delhi telecom circle in December 1999, the Kolkata circle in July 2000 and the Gujarat circle in September 2000. Licences for these circles had initially been awarded by the DoT in 1994, 1997 and 1995 respectively. Between 1992 and 2006, Hutchison acquired interests in all 23 mobile telecom circles of India.

HMTL was renamed Hutchison Essar Limited (HEL) in August 2005. In Delhi, Uttar Pradesh (East), Rajasthan and Haryana, Essar Group was the major partner. But later Hutch took the majority stake. By the time of Hutchison Telecom's initial public offering in 2004, Hutchison Whampoa had acquired interests in six mobile telecommunications operators providing service in 13 of India's 23 licence areas and following the completion of the acquisition of BPL Mobile that number increased to 16. In 2006, it announced the acquisition of a company (Essar Spacetel — A subsidiary of Essar Group) that held licence applications for the seven remaining licence areas. Initially, the company grew its business in the largest wireless markets in India — in cities like Mumbai, Delhi and Kolkata. In these densely populated urban areas it was able to establish a robust network, well-known brand and large distribution network – all vital to long-term success in India. Then it also targeted business users and high-end post-paid customers which helped Hutchison Essar to consistently generate a higher Average Revenue Per User (ARPU) than its competitors. By adopting this focused growth plan, it was able to establish leading positions in India's largest markets providing the resources to expand its footprint nationwide. In February 2007, Hutchison Telecom announced that it had entered into a binding agreement with a subsidiary of Vodafone Group Plc to sell its 67% direct and indirect equity and loan interests in Hutchison Essar Limited for a total cash consideration (before costs, expenses and interests) of approximately $11.1 billion. The Acquisition was completed on May 8, 2007.

Hutch was often praised for its award-winning advertisements which all follow a clean, minimalist look. A recurrent theme is that its message "Hi" stands out visibly though it uses only white letters on red background. Another successful ad campaign in 2003 featured a pug named Cheeka following a boy around in unlikely places, with the tagline, "Wherever you go, our network follows." The simple yet powerful advertisement campaigns won it many admirers. Advertisements featuring the pug were continued by Vodafone even after rebranding.  The brand subsequently introduced ZooZoos which gained even higher popularity than was created by the Pug. Vodafone's creative agency is O&M while Harit Nagpal was the Marketing Director during the various phases of its brand evolution.

Vodafone purchases Essar's stake
In July 2011, Vodafone Group bought the mobile phone business of its partner Essar for $5.46 billion. This meant Vodafone owns 74% of Essar. On 11 February 2007, Vodafone agreed to acquire the controlling interest of 67% held by Li Ka Shing Holdings in Hutch-Essar for US$11.1 billion, pipping Reliance Communications, Hinduja Group, and Essar Group, which is the owner of the remaining 33%. The whole company was valued at USD 18.8 billion. The transaction closed on 8 May 2007. In April 2014, India based Piramal Group sold its 11% Stake in Vodafone India to Prime Metals, an indirect subsidiary of Vodafone Group.

Vodafone-Hutchison tax case 

Vodafone was embroiled in a $2.5 billion tax dispute with the Indian Income Tax Department over its purchase of Hutchison Essar Telecom services in April 2007. It was being alleged by the Indian Tax authorities that the transaction involved purchase of assets of an Indian Company, and therefore the transaction, or part thereof was  liable to be taxed in India.

Vodafone Group Plc. entered India in 2007 through a subsidiary based in the Netherlands, which acquired Hutchison Telecommunications International Ltd’s (HTIL) stake in Hutchison Essar Ltd (HEL)—the joint venture that held and operated telecom licences in India. This Cayman Islands transaction, along with several related agreements, gave Vodafone control over 67% of HEL and extinguished Hong Kong-based Hutchison’s rights of control in India, a deal that cost the world’s largest telco $11.2 billion at the time.

In January 2012, the Indian Supreme Court passed the judgement in favour of Vodafone, saying that the Indian Income tax department had "no jurisdiction" to levy tax on overseas transaction between companies incorporated outside India. However, Indian government thinks otherwise. It believes that if an Indian company, Hutchison India Ltd., conducts a financial transaction, then the government should get its tax from it. Therefore, in 2012, India changed its Income Tax Act retroactively and made sure that any company, in similar circumstances, is not able to avoid tax by operating out of tax-havens like the Cayman Islands or Lichtenstein. In May 2012, Indian authorities confirmed that they were going to charge Vodafone about 20,000 crore (US $3.3 billion) in tax and fines. The second phase of the dispute is about to start. The Bombay high court on Thursday directed the Income-Tax Appellate Tribunal (ITAT) to hear a Rs.8,600 crore transfer-pricing tax dispute relating to the Indian arm of Vodafone Group Plc from 21 February on a daily basis till a final order is passed.

Merger with Idea Cellular

The entry of Jio in 2016 had led to various mergers and consolidations in the Indian telecom sector. It was announced in March 2017 that even Idea Cellular and Vodafone India would be merged. The merger got approval from Department Of Telecommunications in July 2018. On August 30, 2018, National Company Law Tribunal gave the final nod to the Vodafone-Idea merger   The merger was completed on 31 August 2018, and the newly merged entity was named Vodafone Idea Limited. The merger created the largest telecom company in India by subscribers and by revenue. Under the terms of the deal, the Vodafone Group holds a 45.2% stake in the combined entity, the Aditya Birla Group holds 26% and the remaining shares will be held by the public.

Mobile network

Since 2011, Vodafone launched 3G network using 900 MHz and 2100 MHz. The first city to receive 3G service was Lucknow in Uttar Pradesh.

M-Pesa, was launched in India as a close partnership with HDFC bank in November 2011.

On 28 June 2012, Vodafone launched a new international roaming package under which the users shall have not to pay multiple rentals in the countries they are visiting.

On 19 May 2015, TRAI announced that Vodafone had been awarded spectrum in 9 circles for 3G coverage, bidding around  11617.86 million (the second highest amount in the auctions) for the spectrum.

On 8 December 2015, Vodafone announced the roll out of its 4G LTE coverage in India on 1.8 GHz and 2.1 GHz bands starting from Kochi. The service became available to customers in India nationally in 2017, with plans for further expansion. Vodafone now starts 2100Mhz and 2500 MHz for 4G by which customers will get superior 4G speed than previous.

VoLTE
Vodafone India had started rolling its 4G VoLTE services in the country under the tag Vodafone Super Volte. Gujarat was the first circle to receive that service. Before the merger with Vodafone Idea Limited the circles where the company was providing VoLTE were:

West Bengal
Assam
Gujarat
 Delhi & NCR
 Haryana
 Karnataka
 Maharashtra & Goa
 Mumbai
 Rajasthan
 UP(W)
 UP(E)
 Punjab
 Kerala
 Kolkata
 Chennai

Awards and recognition

LinkedIn Top Attractors 2017 Award- Vodafone India ranked 20th
CIO Choice 2018  Award winner- Vodafone Business Services recognized as the chosen leader for Telecom Carrier - Leased Lines & Mobile Access 
The Brand Trust Report, 2011 published by Trust Research Advisory has ranked Vodafone as the 16th most trusted brand in India.
 Flame Awards Asia 2017 for #Saluteourfarmers campaign: Silver for the Best Farmer Connect initiative and Bronze for the Best use of Social Media
Aegis Graham Bell Awards 2017: Vodafone Business Services for Innovative Marketing Campaign for the Ready Business CampaignAegis Graham Bell Awards 2017 and Vodafone Business Services for Innovative Marketing Campaign for the Ready Business Campaign
Voice and Data Telecom Leadership Awards 2015:Special leadership recognition to: Vodafone RED for marketing

See also 

 Vodafone Idea Limited
 Vodafone
 Bharti Airtel
 Hutchison Essar
 Vodafone Belvedere Towers metro station
 Reliance Jio

References

External links
 

Telecommunications companies of India
Vodafone
Mobile phone companies of India
Internet service providers of India
Companies based in Mumbai
Telecommunications companies established in 1994
Indian companies established in 1994
Essar Group
Indian subsidiaries of foreign companies
1994 establishments in Maharashtra